Chaudhry Akhtar Ali Vario was a Pakistani politician and head of the Vario family of Sialkot District, Punjab province. He was one of the founding members of the  Pakistan Muslim League (Junejo) and was elected as a Member of the National Assembly of Pakistan, and Member of the Provincial Assembly of Punjab several times. He was awarded the title of "King Maker" by Benazir Bhutto.

Early life 
Vario was born in Gurdaspur district in 1933, to a Gujjar family. His father Chaudhry Ghulam Ahmad Zaildar was a prominent personality of his area who migrated to Pakistan with his family in 1947.

Political career
Vario served as Director Central Co-operative Bank from 1973-1975. In the 1979 Local Government Elections Vario was elected as Chairman District Council Sialkot , Vario was re -elected for the same office in 1983 elections.

In the 1985 Non party General Elections he was elected as a Member of the Provincial Assembly (MPA) from PP-143 Sialkot . He was appointed Special Assistant to the Chief Minister.

He was re-elected in 1988 as a representative of the Islami Jamhoori Ittehad from PP-104 Sialkot and was given portfolio of Minister of Communication and Works by the Chief Minister, Nawaz Sharif . In these polls his brother Chaudhary Abdul Sattar Vario won the National Assembly seat of NA-88 after Nawaz sharif gave up this seat in favour of his provincial assembly seat .

In the 1990 elections he contested from two seats PP-103 and PP-106 Sialkot and won both the seats . He retained the PP-106 seat .In the same polls his brother Chaudhary Abdul Sattar won the National Assembly seat of NA-88. Akhtar Ali Vario’s son Chaudhary Khush Akhtar Subhani won the PP-104 seat and became an MPA for the first time and became Chairman Standing Committee for Food.

In 1993 elections Ch. Akhtar Ali contested from  Pakistan Muslim League Junejo for a National Assembly seat NA -86 and became a Member of the National Assembly (MNA)  by defeating Ch. Amir Hussain, a former Speaker of the National Assembly, and being appointed the Chairman Standing Committee Narcotics, in the same election he contested for a provincial assembly seat PP-106 by defeating Syed ifthikar ul hassan, he chose to retain the National Assembly seat and the provincial seat was won by his nephew Armaghan Subhani from Pakistan Muslim League (J). His brother, Chaudhry Abdul Sattar Vario, won for 3rd term as MNA from NA-88 in the same elections and became Federal Minister for Industries.In the same polls his son, Ch. Khush Akhtar Subhani, became MPA from PP-104 and was awarded the ministries of Population Welfare and Prisons, Housing & Physical Planning and Environmental Planning in Watto's ministry. 

He later joined PML-Q and played important role in the successes of their candidates in the 2001 LB polls, in which they gained 61 UC Nazim slots from a possible 124 seats.

Imprisonment
He was imprisoned during 2002-2003 by the National Accountability Bureau, who accused him of corruption charges, but was acquitted by Lahore High Court, which deemed the case against him not to be strong enough.

Death
Ch. Akhtar Ali died at the age of 76, in Services Institute of Medical Sciences on 16 June 2008 after being in a coma for five days. He had suffered from diabetes and heart disease. He was buried on 17 June in village of Vario Sialkot.

References

2008 deaths
People from Sialkot District
Punjab MPAs 1985–1988
Punjab MPAs 1988–1990
Punjab MPAs 1990–1993